Valery Bogdanov may refer to:

 Valery Bogdanov (footballer, born 1952), Russian football player and coach
 Valery Bogdanov (footballer, born 1966), Russian football player